California Creek, formerly Painted Cave Spring Creek a stream in Val Verde County, Texas, formerly a tributary of Devils River it now flows into the north side of Amistad Reservoir at an elevation of 1119 feet.

California Creek was the route of the San Antonio-El Paso Road followed northwest from Painted Caves to the point that the trail diverted to the upper Evans Creek and California Spring.

See also
List of rivers of Texas

References

Rivers of Val Verde County, Texas
Tributaries of the Rio Grande
San Antonio–El Paso Road
Rivers of Texas